Timothy Wesco is a Republican member of the Indiana House of Representatives, representing the 21st District since 2010. Following his election at 25, he was the youngest member of the Indiana House.

Abortion 
Wesco opposes abortion rights in almost all circumstances, including rape or incest.  In a July 2022 state House debate for a bill that would ban abortion in Indiana, he argued that rape victims should not have access to abortion, however, his voting record showed otherwise, as on the floor he voted against Amendment 76, which would have removed those exceptions.

References

External links
Representative Timothy Wesco official Indiana State Legislature site
http://timothywesco.com/ official Site
 

Living people
Republican Party members of the Indiana House of Representatives
21st-century American politicians
Year of birth missing (living people)